Storm Surge is a 'Spinning Rapids' water ride at Thorpe Park, Surrey, United Kingdom manufactured by WhiteWater West. It is located in the Amity area of the park, in the vicinity of the park's Tidal Wave-themed ride. Storm Surge, which opened in March 2011 with a fairground ride theme, makes use of the Tidal Wave water which has washed into Amity, as the town enters the 1970s. The ride was relocated from the transforming Cypress Gardens Florida, which was acquired by Merlin Entertainments to be turned into Legoland Florida.

Ride experience 
The ride contains a 19.5-metre lift hill, and gradually 'spins' to the bottom of the slide, as velcro has been added to make the model of ride (which is usually marketed towards families) more intense, to suit the park's own target audience. As the ride itself does not get riders very wet, various water features have been added, including guest-operated water guns, overhead showers, sprinklers, and geysers.

Nearby 
The ride area also includes the park's main gift and snack shop, the 'Thorpe Mega Store', which houses clothing, many different souvenirs, including shirts, hoodies, trophies, etc., and snacks, as well as 'The Doughnut Factory ', a small snack kiosk which sells refreshments.

See also
 2011 in amusement parks

External links
 Thorpe Park
 WhiteWater West

Buildings and structures in Surrey
Thorpe Park water rides
Amusement rides introduced in 2011